FlyGeorgia (IATA: FGE) was the second national airline of Georgia, with its headquarters in Tbilisi, beginning its operations in August 2012. It was a privately owned and controlled airline, which offered flights to a number of destinations in Europe, the Middle East and South Asia as well as in the CIS. As of the end of 2013, its operating license has been suspended. The company slogan was The World Awaits You.

History
Dubai, United Arab Emirates-based Iranians Hoshang Hosseinpour (born 21 March 1967, Tehran), Houshang Farsoudeh (born 10 October 1968, Tehran) and Pourya Nayebi (born 25 July 1974, Tehran) co-founded Fly Georgia in 2011.

On 30 July 2012, it was officially announced that FlyGeorgia would start operating flights from Tbilisi to Batumi and the first flight would be launched on 3 August 2012. On 6 October 2012, it was officially stated that FGE would start direct flights from Tbilisi to Amsterdam with an Airbus 319.

At the end of October 2012, FlyGeorgia announced it had ordered 2 more A320 aircraft. The first of these aircraft would be delivered at the end of 2012, whilst the second one would be delivered to Tbilisi in March 2013. They would be purchased from the leasing company. Fly Georgia also declared it would start flights to Germany, Ukraine, UAE, Iraq, Brussels, Kazakhstan, Armenia, and many destinations to come.

In September 2013, Fly Georgia's aircraft, an A320 and two leased A319-100s, were seized at the Brussels Airport due to unpaid debts.

On 16 October 2013, the Georgian civil aviation authority suspended FlyGeorgia's license and it is no longer allowed to operate any flights until further notice.

Destinations

Fleet

The FlyGeorgia fleet consisted of the following aircraft (as of December 2012):

Notes

References

External links
 Official Fly Georgia website

Defunct airlines of Georgia (country)
Companies based in Tbilisi
Airlines established in 2011
Airlines disestablished in 2013
2011 establishments in Georgia (country)
2013 disestablishments in Georgia (country)